Shokin (Russian: Шокин) is a Russian masculine surname; its feminine counterpart is Shokina. It may refer to the following notable people:
Dmitriy Shokin (born 1992), Uzbekistani taekwondo competitor
Viktor Shokin (born 1952), Ukrainian lawyer and politician

See also
Shokhin

Russian-language surnames